The 2023 CCHA Men's Ice Hockey Tournament was the 44th tournament in the history of the men's Central Collegiate Hockey Association. It began on March 3 and ended on March 18, 2023. All games were played at home campus sites. Minnesota State won the tournament and received the CCHA's automatic bid for the 2023 NCAA Division I Men's Ice Hockey Tournament.

Format
The first round of the postseason tournament features a best-of-three games format, while the semifinals and final are single games held at the campus sites of the highest remaining seeds. All eight conference teams participated in the tournament. Teams are seeded No. 1 through No. 8 according to their final conference standings, with a tiebreaker system used to seed teams with an identical number of points accumulated. The higher-seeded teams each earned home ice and hosted one of the lower-seeded teams. The teams that advance out of the quarterfinals are reseeded according to the regular season standings. The semifinals and final are single-elimination games. The winners of the semifinals play one another to determine the conference tournament champion.

Conference standings

Bracket
Teams are reseeded for the semifinals

Note: * denotes overtime period(s)

Results
Note: All game times are local.

Quarterfinals

(1) Minnesota State vs. (8) Lake Superior State

(2) Michigan Tech vs. (7) St. Thomas

(3) Bowling Green vs. (6) Ferris State

(4) Northern Michigan vs. (5) Bemidji State

Semifinals

(1) Minnesota State vs. (6) Ferris State

(2) Michigan Tech vs. (4) Northern Michigan

Championship

(1) Minnesota State vs. (4) Northern Michigan

Tournament awards

Most Valuable Player

References

CCHA Men's Ice Hockey Tournament
CCHA Men's Ice Hockey Tournament
CCHA Tournament